Pawnee County is the name of several counties in the United States:

 Pawnee County, Kansas 
 Pawnee County, Nebraska 
 Pawnee County, Oklahoma